Danmarks Kommunistiske Ungdom (Communist Youth of Denmark), was the youth wing of Danmarks Kommunistiske Parti. DKU had its origins in Socialdemokratisk Ungdomsforbund (Social Democratic Youth League) founded in 1906. The organization took the name DKU in 1919.

DKU was dissolved in 1990. DKU was a member of World Federation of Democratic Youth.

References

External links
 Article on DKU

Youth wings of communist parties
Youth wings of political parties in Denmark